Fumaria bastardii, commonly, tall ramping fumitory or bastard's fumitory, is a tall (to 2 m.), many-branched herbaceous flowering plant native to Western Europe including the British Isles and the northern Mediterranean. The species is a weed of arable and disturbed ground, and occurs as an introduced alien in many areas of the world with suitable climates, including Southwest Australia and North America.

References 

 Tall Ramping-fumitory

External links 
  Photo

bastardii
Flora of Malta